Jean-Julien Rojer and Horia Tecău were the defending champions, but lost in the semifinals to Ivo Karlović and Łukasz Kubot.
Karlović and Kubot went on to win the title, defeating Pierre-Hugues Herbert and Nicolas Mahut in the final, 6–2, 7–6(11–9).

Seeds

Draw

Draw

References
 Main Draw

Topshelf Openandnbsp;- Doubles
2015 Doubles